Karlsruhe (F223) is the fourth ship of the s of the German Navy.

Design 

The Type 120 or Köln-class frigates were built as smooth-deckers and had very elegant lines. The very diagonally cut bow and the knuckle ribs in the foredeck made it easy to navigate. The hull and parts of the superstructure were made of shipbuilding steel, other superstructure parts were made of aluminum. Due to the installation of gas turbines, large side air inlets were necessary, which could be closed by lamellas. The stern was designed as a round stern. The large funnel was sloped and skirted. Behind the bridge superstructure stood the tall lattice mast with radar and other antennas. The hull was divided into 13 watertight compartments.

On the forecastle was a 10 cm gun, behind it, set higher, a 4 cm twin gun. Behind it stood two quadruple anti-submarine missile launchers 37.5 cm from Bofors. A 4 cm Bofors single gun on each side of the aft superstructure and another 4 cm double mount at the end of the superstructure. There was a second 10 cm gun on the quarterdeck. In addition, there were two 53.3 cm torpedo tubes behind the front superstructures. They were used to fire Mk-44 torpedoes. Mine rails were laid behind the torpedo tubes and ran to the stern.

Construction and career 
Karlsruhe was laid down on 29 October 1958 and launched on 15 August 1959 in Stülcken & Sohn, Germany. She was commissioned on 7 April 1962.

The Karlsruhe was sold to Turkish Navy after active service in the German Navy and since 28 March 1983 sailed there under the Turkish flag as the destroyer Gazi Osman Pasa with the identification D-360.

In 1984 it was renamed Gelibolu, but kept the Identification D-360.

Her last decommissioning took place there on 27 June 1994.

Gallery

References 

Gardiner, Robert and Stephen Chumbley. Conway's All The World's Fighting Ships 1947–1995. Annapolis, Maryland, USA: Naval Institute Press, 1995. .
Prézelin, Bernard and A.D. Baker III. The Naval Institute Guide to Combat Fleets of the World 1990/1991. Annapolis, Maryland, USA: Naval Institute Press, 1990. .

Köln-class frigates
1959 ships
Ships built in Hamburg